Joseph Whitaker, Esq.,  (12 July 1850 – 27 May 1932) was an English naturalist who lived for most of his life at Rainworth, in Nottinghamshire, England. He was also a keen sportsman, botanist, fisherman and collected curios. He wrote several books, and some of his collection passed to the Mansfield Museum.

Personal life
Whitaker was born at Ramsdale Farm, Arnold near Nottingham on 12 July 1850, the oldest son of another Joseph Whitaker. He received his education at Uppingham School, and loved the outdoors, a trait he learned from his father. For most of his life he lived at Rainworth Lodge, on Blidworth Lane at Rainworth. He married Mary Edison at Blidworth church on 16 April 1872, and they had five children. The first, Ethel Mary, died in infancy, while the fifth, Vera, married Sir Harold Bowden, 2nd Baronet, in 1908, but the marriage was short lived and they divorced in 1919. Among Whitaker's unusual traits was his habit of always walking on the road, and never on the pavement. He died on 27 May 1932 at Rainworth Lodge.

The Joseph Whitaker School in Rainworth was named after him.

Professional life

Whitaker was a naturalist, and his home at Rainworth Lodge looked more like a museum, as it was full of cases of stuffed birds and other exhibits of natural life. One was an Egyptian nightjar, at the time the first known sighting of one in Britain, and only the second in Europe. It had been shot by a gamekeeper called Albert Spinks on 23 June 1883. Spinks knew of Whitaker's interest in birds, and having mentioned it, Whitaker retrieved the bird and had it stuffed. He erected a 'Bird Stone' to commemorate the event in Thieves Wood, to the west of Rainworth, but this was vandalised in the 1980s, and was replaced by a modern artifice. The nightjar, together with many other exhibits, was given to Mansfield Museum on his death. He became an authority on many kinds of wildlife, and especially British birds, although he was not averse to shooting them. On 10 October 1906 he and six others held a shooting party, which gained the record for the biggest bag in Nottinghamshire. The game killed that day included 1,504 partridges.

Whitaker was a keen botanist, fisherman and sportsman, and collected curios. He collected deer horns, aided by the fact that he had his own deer park, which he populated with Japanese deer. This was situated immediately to the south of his house, and is shown on the 1900 Ordnance Survey map, but not on the map from 1885/1891. In his own description of the park, Whitaker stated that it covered  and contained 21 fallow deer. Also in the enclosure were ten four-horned St Kilda sheep, three emus and two rheas.

As well as serving as a Justice of the Peace, he became a fellow of the Zoological Society of London, and vice-president of the Selborne Society. He also commissioned a window in Selborne church as a memorial to Revd. Gilbert White, a pioneer of birdwatching. The window has three lights, showing St Francis and a number of birds, all of which are mentioned in White's book The Natural History and Antiquities of Selborne. Whitaker wrote a number of books, including at least one volume of poems, and made contributions to the Victoria County History series of books. His collection included china, bric-a-brac, books and prints, and among the curios he amassed was possibly the first known circular saw, which was manufactured at the Barringer, Manners and Wallis factory in Rock Valley, Mansfield.

Works
The following books written by Whitaker are listed in the British Library catalogue.
 (with W J Sterland)

Whitaker also contributed to (scientific) journals, like for instance The Zoologist.

Bibliography

References

External links
 

English naturalists
People from Arnold, Nottinghamshire
1850 births
1932 deaths
Fellows of the Zoological Society of London
People educated at Uppingham School
People from Rainworth
People from Selborne